Lockwood railway station is a railway station in Huddersfield, England. It serves the Lockwood district of Huddersfield, and services are provided by Northern.

The station comprises a single side platform alongside the single-line of the railway, although the remains of a second platform alongside the site of the former second track (removed in 1989) are still visible.

The former Meltham branch line branched off the main line just before the viaduct. This line closed to passengers in 1949 and to freight in 1965. To the north, the route passes through a short tunnel then crosses another large viaduct across the River Colne before joining the main line at Springwood Junction.

Facilities
The station is unstaffed and has a basic shelter on its single active platform; all tickets must be bought on the train or in advance, as there is no ticket machine.  A help point and digital information screen are provided to offer train running information.  Step-free access is via a ramp from the station car park.

Services
All services to the station are operated by Northern Trains. There is an hourly service in both directions on Monday to Saturdays and on Sundays also (though starting later in the morning).

Accidents and incidents
On 28 October 1913, a freight train became divided. The rear portion ran away and was derailed at the station.
In 1952, a rake of wagons ran away and was derailed by trap points at the station.
On 28 June 1958, a rake of four carriages ran away and were derailed by trap points at the station, crashing into the booking office.

Gallery

References

External links

Railway stations in Huddersfield
DfT Category F2 stations
Former Lancashire and Yorkshire Railway stations
Northern franchise railway stations
Railway stations in Great Britain opened in 1850